Cedric is a masculine given name invented by Walter Scott in the 1819 novel Ivanhoe. 

The invented name is based on  Cerdic, the name of a 6th-century Anglo-Saxon king (itself from Brittonic Coroticus).

The name was not popularly used until the children's book  Little Lord Fauntleroy by Frances Hodgson Burnett was published in 1885 to 1886, the protagonist of which is called Cedric Errol. The book was highly successful, causing a fashion trend in children's formal dress in America and popularized the given name. People named Cedric born in the years following the novel's publication include British naval officer Cedric Holland (1889–1950), American war pilot Cedric Fauntleroy (1891–1973), Irish art director Austin Cedric Gibbons (1893–1960) and British actor Cedric Hardwicke (1893–1964).

The name was also applied to Nissan's executive car between 1960 to 2004 (private use) and 2015 (taxi) as Nissan Cedric.

For the Moto G5 smartphone was Cedric as codename applied.

People
Cédric Bakambu (born 1991), French-Congolese football player
Cedric Belfrage (1904–1990), British writer
Cedric Benson (1982-2019), American football player
Cedric Bixler-Zavala (born 1974), American musician
Cedric Bozeman (born 1983), American basketball player
Cedric Brooks (1943–2013), Jamaican musician
Cedric Ceballos (born 1969), American basketball player
Cedric Gervais (born 1979), French disc jockey
Cédric Gracia (born 1978), French cyclist
Cedric Gibbons (1893–1960), Irish-born American art director
Cedric Glover (born 1965), American politician
Cedric van der Gun (born 1979), Dutch footballer 
Cedric "K-Ci" Hailey (born 1969), American singer
Cedric Hardwicke (1893–1964), British actor
Cédric Heymans (born 1978), French rugby player
Cedric Holland (1889–1950), British naval officer
Cédric Kanté (born 1979), French football player
Cédric Klapisch (born 1961), French film director
Cédric Lesouquet (born 1972), French bass player
Cedric Kyles  (born 1964), aka Cedric the Entertainer, American actor and comedian
Cedric Maake (born 1965), South African serial killer and rapist
Cédric Matéta Nkomi (born 1992) French-Congolese Musician 
Cedric Maxwell (born 1955), American basketball player
Cedric McKinnon (1968–2016), American  football player
Cédric Michaud (born 1976), French skater
Cédric Mongongu (born 1989), Congolese football player
Cedric Morris (1889–1982), Welsh painter
Cedric Mullins (born 1994), American baseball player
Cedric Nicolas-Troyan (born 1969), French-American film director
Cedric Oglesby (born 1977), American football player
Cédric Pénicaud (born 1971), French swimmer
Cédric Perrin (born 1974), French politician
Cédric Pioline (born 1969), French tennis player 
Cedric Price (1934–2003), British architect
Cedric Richmond (born 1973), American politician
Cedric Robinson (1933-2021), British guide and fisherman
Cedric Rogers (born 1915), British Painter, Author and Illustrator 
Cedric Sanders (born 1982), American actor
Cedric Smith, several people
Cédric Soares (born 1991), Portuguese football player
Cédric Taymans (born 1975), Belgian judoka
Cedric Tillman (disambiguation), multiple people
Cedric Thornberry (1936-2014), an international lawyer and Assistant-Secretary-General of the United Nations
Cédric Van der Elst (born 1980), Belgian soccer player
Cédric Villani (born 1973), French mathematician 
Cedric Yarbrough (born 1973), American comedian and actor

Fiction
Cedric the Saxon (Cedric of Rotherwood), character in the 1819 novel Ivanhoe by Walter Scott
Cedric Errol, character in the 1886 novel Little Lord Fauntleroy by Frances Hodgson Burnett
Cédric, character in the Franco-Belgian comic book Cédric by Laudec and Cauvin
Cedric Crackenthorpe, character in the 4.50 from Paddington by Agatha Christie
Cedric, character in the 1992 film Home Alone 2: Lost in New York
Cedric Daniels, character in the television series The Wire
Cedric Diggory, character in the Harry Potter series
Cedric (W.I.T.C.H.), character in the Italian comic book series W.I.T.C.H.
Cedric Sneer, character in The Raccoons, a Canadian animated television series
Cedric the Owl, character in King's Quest adventure game series and other Sierra Entertainment video games.
Cedric the Sorcerer, character in Sofia the First animated TV series
Cedric K. Ros—, character, the paternal grandfather of the Phantomhive twins in the manga Black Butler/Kuroshitsuji.

References

English masculine given names
English given names invented by fiction writers